According to the latest data (2023), there are 59 broadband Internet service providers in Nepal. All those are including new and old internet service providers which are active in the operation across various parts of Nepal. Some are giant and some are small but they all are providing internet services in Nepal. Majority of Nepali ISP's use Fiber To The Home (FTTH) technology. Some are upgrading their legacy Cable/DSL/Wireless networks to Fiber.

Total Subscriber Base Across All ISP's : 2.445 Million

Type Of Connection : Fiber : 2.345 Million, Cable/DSL : 84,059, Wireless : 15,633

Here is the list of some of the popular internet service providers in Nepal (2023).
Nepal Telecom
Infonet
Websurfer 
Dishhome
Techminds
Subisu
CG Net
WorldLink Communications
Firstlink Communications
Vianet
Classic Tech
Broadband Solutions
Unified Communication 
Eastlink
Konnect Nepal
Pokhara Net
Barahi internet
Arrownet
Zishan Network
Sky Broadband
Broadlink
Shikhar Net
Web Networks Pvt. Ltd.
Wifi Nepal

References

Internet in Nepal
internet service providers
internet service providers